Scruggs, Vandervoort & Barney was a department store founded in St. Louis, Missouri in 1850, by M.V.L. McClelland and Richard Scruggs as McClelland, Scruggs & Company. The company started out as a Dry goods store, with the first store opened on North 4th street in downtown St. Louis, later expanding. In 1860, William L. Vandervoort joined the company. Then, in 1870, McClelland retired and Charles E. Barney replaced him in the company.

In 1907, the company moved to The Syndicate at Tenth and Olive streets. Ten years later, they acquired the Mermod Jaccard King Jewelry Company, incorporating themselves into its downtown location. They were well known for holding several varieties of fashion shows. In the 1950s, then known as "Vandervoort's," they opened a branch store in Clayton, Missouri, and, later Crestwood Plaza in Crestwood, Missouri. The company was picketed by the NAACP for having unfair hiring practices, like many companies at the time.

Vandervoort's suffered financial pressures and shuttered operations in 1969. The Crestwood Plaza branch would be taken over by Famous-Barr the same year.

References

Defunct department stores based in Missouri
Companies based in St. Louis
1850 establishments in Missouri
1969 disestablishments in Missouri